is a Japanese entrepreneur who was a founder and chairman of Huser Co., Ltd.

Biography
In 1953, he was born in Shikama, Kami District, Miyagi Prefecture.  In 2005, he became the focus of attention in a scandal involving architectural forgery.  On May 17, 2006, he was arrested for false pretenses along with Kimura Construction's president Moriyoshi Kimura.

See also
Huser
Hidetsugu Aneha
Togo Fujita
Moriyoshi Kimura
Akira Shinozuka
Takeshi Uchikawa

External links
News from "The Japan Times Online"
LDP vet Ito denies arranging Huser meeting with ministry
Diet hears Soken deny knowing of fraud in '04
Huser boss clams up before the Diet
Huser sold condos knowing their safety was in doubt

1953 births
Living people
People from Miyagi Prefecture
Japanese businesspeople